Miriam Flynn (born June 18, 1952) is an American voice and character actress. She is best known as Cousin Catherine in the National Lampoon's Vacation and Grandma Longneck in The Land Before Time franchises. She has acted in other films and in several television series, the latter including a recurring role as Sister Helen on the Fox/WB sitcom Grounded for Life.

Career

Second City 
Before breaking into television, Flynn was a member of the Second City improv troupe in 1975. She appeared on stage alongside Shelley Long, George Wendt, Andrea Martin, Catherine O'Hara, and James Belushi.

Film and television 
Flynn was a regular cast member in The Tim Conway Show, a comedy-variety show that aired on CBS from March 1980 through summer 1981, acting in sketch comedy in each episode. She then starred in her own sitcom, Maggie, on ABC, but the show was short-lived, airing in October and November 1981 and in April–May 1982 before being cancelled. She appeared in an episode of the classic television show Cheers entitled "Love Thy Neighbor" (Season 4, Episode 8, air date November 21, 1985) in which she played Phyllis Henshaw, Norm & Vera Peterson's next-door neighbor. In fall 1988, she co-starred in the short-lived CBS sitcom Raising Miranda.

In 1995, she was the voice of Maa the Ewe in the hit film, Babe. In 1996–1997, she was a regular cast member in Malcolm & Eddie, playing Kelly, a bar owner and landlord to the main characters, for the program's first season.

From 2001 to 2005 she played the recurring character Sister Helen on the Fox/WB sitcom Grounded for Life. In 2004, she played Coop's mom in Megas XLR. Flynn also appeared in an episode of George Lopez "George VS. George" (2003) episode. In that episode she played the role of Brenda, a bank employee. 

As a voice artist, Flynn has been featured in The Land Before Time series, as Grandma Longneck after Linda Gary's death in 1995; on both Taz-Mania and What-a-Mess as the title character's mother, Jean; as Poil in The Spooktacular New Adventures of Casper; and in Family Guy as well as Rudy's mother, Millie Tabootie on the Nickelodeon show, ChalkZone and Aunt Vera on the Cartoon Network show, Ben 10.

Her best known film role is as Cousin Catherine in National Lampoon's Vacation (1983), National Lampoon's Christmas Vacation (1989), Vegas Vacation (1997) and National Lampoon's Christmas Vacation 2 (2003). Her other acting roles include First Family (1980), National Lampoon's Class Reunion (1982), Mr. Mom (1983), Family Ties (1986), For Keeps (1988), 18 Again! (1988), Stealing Home (1988), Lonely Hearts (1991), Evolution (2001), Wieners (2008), About Fifty (2011) and Bucky Larson: Born to Be a Star (2011).

Filmography

Film

Television

References

External links
 

1952 births
Living people
Actresses from Cleveland
American film actresses
American stage actresses
American television actresses
American voice actresses
20th-century American actresses
21st-century American actresses